Richard Lee Tylski (born February 27, 1971) is a former professional American football player. Tylski, an offensive lineman, played seven seasons in the National Football League, mainly for the Jacksonville Jaguars.  He played college football for Utah State University.

In May 2008, Tylski was placed in a pretrial intervention program after he admitted in court to abusing his adopted daughter. His wife Jane pleaded guilty to one count of aggravated child abuse and was given two years probation.

On February 24, 2010, Tylski and his wife were ordered by a judge to pay 1.25 million dollars to their former adopted daughter.

References

1971 births
Living people
Players of American football from San Diego
American football offensive linemen
Utah State Aggies football players
Jacksonville Jaguars players
Pittsburgh Steelers players
Carolina Panthers players